Roncal – Erronkari is a town and municipality located in the province and autonomous community of Navarre, northern Spain.

Notable people
 

Fructuoso Orduna (1893–1973), artist

References

External links
 RONCAL - ERRONKARI in the Bernardo Estornés Lasa - Auñamendi Encyclopedia (Euskomedia Fundazioa) 

Municipalities in Navarre